Udea bipunctalis is a species of moth in the family Crambidae. It is found in France, Portugal and Spain, on Sicily and Crete and in Syria, Turkey and Russia.

References

Moths described in 1851
bipunctalis
Moths of Europe
Moths of Asia